The 2019–20 season was Dundee's first season back in the second flight of Scottish football since their relegation at the end of the 2018–19 season. Dundee also competed in the League Cup, the Scottish Cup and the Challenge Cup.

On 13 March 2020 the Scottish football season was suspended with immediate effect due to the COVID-19 pandemic. On 15 April a resolution by the SPFL passed, cancelling the Championship season early and cancelling the play-offs.

Season summary

Pre-season
Dundee hired former U18s and reserve manager James McPake as manager for the 2019–20 season, and also hired former Raith Rovers manager and current Northern Ireland national team assistant manager Jimmy Nicholl as assistant manager. On 18 July, it was announced that Gordon Strachan would become Technical Director of the club, with a large focus of his role being in the development of the club's Youth Academy.

July
Their opening competitive games in the League Cup gave reason both for optimism and concern. Coming out of their first match away to Raith Rovers, Dundee left with an impressive 0–3 victory behind them. However, this strong win was followed by two consecutive frustrating goalless draws against lower league opposition, though both results were masked somewhat through the Dees winning both penalty shootouts to gain extra points in both matches. Dundee closed out their League Cup group campaign with a 1–0 home win over fellow Championship side Inverness CT, cementing the side as group winners.

August
The league campaign got underway away to Dunfermline. After a dismal first half display where the Pars went up by 2 and were unlucky to not score more, Dundee came out with a draw after Danny Johnson netted two penalties and the side improved in the second half to leave with a point. Dundee followed up with a more impressive showing at Dens, defeating Ayr United 1–0 via an Andrew Nelson header. In their League Cup second round match, Dundee would provide tough opposition to Premiership side Aberdeen and would lead for the majority for the game, before the Dons netted a late equaliser and then a winner in extra time. Upon returning to league action, Dundee would play out a 0–0 draw at home against Inverness, before taking on rivals Dundee United in the first Dundee derby in 2 years, and the first league derby since the Dees relegated their rivals from the Premiership three years prior. In front of over 14,000 fans at Tannadice, a bizarre and controversial game swung the way of the Terrors, who ran out 6–2 winners in what was a rough night for the Dark Blues.

September
Any hope of a quick bounce-back after the derby humiliation was lost when Dundee once again underperformed against lower league opposition and went out in embarrassing fashion at home to Elgin City in the Challenge Cup. In their return to league action, Dundee mustered an important 2–1 home win against Alloa to end their winless run, but could not keep the momentum up and lost their next game on the road to Morton. The away struggles continued for the Dee, as they had to settle for a point against Queen of the South the following week.

October
Upon their return to Dens, Dundee had a more confident and encouraging showing against Arbroath, running out 2–0 winners with relative comfort. The struggle to maintain a positive streak continued however, as a late collapse led to a defeat to Partick Thistle. Under pressure to improve performance in a tight league, the Dee would win their first away league game of the season in a hard-fought contest against Ayr United, and followed that up with their first consecutive league wins since May 2018 with a comfortable 0–3 away to Alloa.

November
Dundee's positive momentum continued with their third consecutive victory, in a home game against Morton. This was the first time in exactly 5 years since Dundee last won three league games in a row, as well as the first team they defeated not starting with 'A' in the league. This positive momentum did not carry into the Dundee derby, as Dundee United battled their way to another victory over their rivals in a sold out Dens Park. After a two-week break, Dundee turned in another unimpressive display, losing away to Inverness. The Dark Blues' woes continued the following week, and despite scoring a late equaliser, they immediately gave away a losing goal to Queen of the South.

December
Dundee managed to take a point from Arbroath at Gayfield Park to end their three-game losing streak. Desperate for an end to their winless run, Dundee put on a terrific first-half performance against on-form Dunfermline, making it 4–1 just after the second half began. Despite playing against 10 men for the majority of the second half, Dundee once again collapsed defensively, letting their opponents claw back. The Dee however managed to hang on and survive with a 4–3 victory. The positive momentum continued with an away clean sheet win against Partick Thistle. Dundee closed out the year with a very respectable performance and draw away to league leaders and rivals Dundee United, being the first team to take points off of them at Tannadice, and moved up to third place for the new year.

January 
Despite having a great opportunity to gain further ground in the league in a home game against 2nd-placed Inverness CT, Dundee once again capitulated in a big game, losing 0–2 in a poor performance. After their game against Ayr United was called off due to a waterlogged pitch, Dundee played their next game against Motherwell in the Scottish Cup. The Dark Blues yet again fell at the first hurdle in the cup and were soundly beaten by their Premiership counterparts. The following week only continued the dismal play, as Dundee were completely dominated once again and failed to score for the third consecutive game in a 2–0 loss to Dunfermline that would have been far worse if not from some good saves by keeper Jack Hamilton.

February 
After bringing in new faces in January, Dundee headed to Cappielow to face Morton. Despite taking an early lead and Morton going down to 10 men, Dundee again couldn't capitalise and could only take home a point, that along with other results dropped them down to 6th place. Dundee finally found some positive form the following week, with a comfortable 2–0 win at home against bottom side Partick Thistle, with Kane Hemmings scoring a brace. Dundee were able to continue their positive swing in momentum with their first win at Palmerston Park in just over 6 years and a second consecutive clean sheet, with Jordon Forster's strike providing Dundee the win and pulling them equal on points with 2nd-placed Inverness CT. The weather however proved too big of a match-up the following week for Dens, leading to Dundee's game with Arbroath to be postponed.

March 
Despite another impressive performance at home to Alloa which saw Dundee's third consecutive clean sheet, missed chances led to a goalless draw. Dundee would extend their run to four straight clean sheets with help from a Conor Hazard penalty save, but yet again would not find the net themselves in another 0–0 draw away to Ayr United. In the reverse fixture 3 days later, the Dark Blues made their chances count, combining a fifth straight clean sheet with 2 goals to again best their play-off rivals.

Season suspension due to COVID-19 and voting controversy 
Unfortunately, Dundee's season and Scottish football's season as a whole were brought to a screeching halt on 13 March, when it was announced by the SPFL that due to the global coronavirus pandemic, all future games for the season would be postponed indefinitely. The initial suspension for all Scottish football was to last until 30 April, until a further update on 9 April postponed all games until 10 June at the earliest. On 8 April the SPFL proposed a vote to end the 2019–20 SPFL season (excluding the Scottish Premiership due to complications with UEFA), with all 42 SPFL member clubs voting on behalf of their current league.

The vote was mired in controversy however, as it was revealed that one Championship club's vote, later discovered to be Dundee's, was one of only a few not received by the SPFL's requested deadline on 10 April. The SPFL released the received votes at 17:00, indicating that one more vote from a Championship club either for or against the proposal would decide the result, incidentally making Dundee's vote the deciding one. Despite initial outcry regarding meeting the requested deadline, league rules indicated Dundee had 28 days to give their vote. Prior to the vote, Dundee were expected to vote against the proposal, and earlier on the day of the vote had released a statement that, while not directly stating what they intended to vote, indicated displeasure with the proposal.

The day following the vote, Inverness CT chief executive and former Dundee CEO Scot Gardiner claimed that Dundee, Inverness and Partick Thistle had all been in agreement prior to the vote that all three clubs would all go against the proposal. Gardiner said all three clubs circulated their votes, and that Dundee supposedly sent their vote in before the 17:00 deadline on 10 April, and shared an image of a filled in voting slip signed by Dundee's Managing Director, John Nelms. When news spread that Dundee's vote had not yet been received by the SPFL, Dundee's club secretary Eric Drysdale informed the others that he had been instructed not to resubmit Dundee's vote, as it was now the casting vote and therefore held more power. The SPFL meanwhile claimed that it had not yet received a vote from Dundee. After a few days of uncertainty regarding the club's intentions, Dundee released a statement on 15 April which made clear their request for serious consideration for league reconstruction was required in order for the club to agree to the proposal. Later that day, the SPFL announced that the proposal had officially been accepted, indicating Dundee had in fact approved it, thus terminating their season effective immediately. Their statement also included a commitment to consult on potential league reconstruction via an expanded Premiership.

On 24 April, an SPFL-commissioned investigation concluded that there was 'no evidence of impropriety'.

Competitions
   

All times are in British Summer Time (BST).

Pre-season and friendlies

Scottish Championship

Dundee will play against Alloa Athletic, Arbroath, Ayr United, Dundee United, Dunfermline Athletic, Greenock Morton, Inverness Caledonian Thistle, Partick Thistle and Queen of the South in the 2019–20 Championship campaign, playing each team four times, twice at home and twice away.

Season was prematurely ended due to the COVID-19 pandemic, leaving 9 games unplayed.

Scottish Cup

As a Premiership side the season prior, Dundee will enter the Scottish Cup in the Fourth Round.

Scottish League Cup

Dundee will be top seeded in the draw for the Scottish League Cup group stage, and will face off against Inverness Caledonian Thistle, Raith Rovers, Peterhead and Cove Rangers in Group D of the tournament.

Group stage

Knockout stage

Scottish Challenge Cup

Dundee will enter the Scottish Challenge Cup in the Third Round.

Team statistics

League table

Results by round

League Cup table

Squad Statistics
As of May 30, 2020 (UTC)

 

|-
|colspan="14"|Players away from the club on loan:

|-
|colspan="14"|Players who left the club during the season:

|}

Transfers

Summer

Players in

Players out

Winter

Players in

Players out

See also

List of Dundee F.C. seasons

References

Dundee F.C. seasons
Dundee